The Virginia Statute for Religious Freedom was drafted in 1777 by Thomas Jefferson in Fredericksburg, Virginia, and introduced into the Virginia General Assembly in Richmond in 1779. On January 16, 1786, the Assembly enacted the statute into the state's law. The statute disestablished the Church of England in Virginia and guaranteed freedom of religion to people of all religious faiths, including Christians of all denominations, Jews, Muslims, and Hindus.  The statute was a notable precursor of the Establishment Clause and Free Exercise Clause of the First Amendment to the United States Constitution.

The Statute for Religious Freedom is one of only three accomplishments Jefferson instructed be put in his epitaph.

Background
Written in 1777 and first introduced in 1779, Jefferson's statute was repeatedly overlooked in the Virginia Assembly until Patrick Henry introduced legislation titled "A Bill Establishing a Provision for Teachers of the Christian Religion" in 1784. James Madison and others led the opposition to Henry's bill which culminated in Madison's Memorial and Remonstrance against Religious Assessments, published on June 20, 1785. As noted by the Library of Congress, "Madison revived [Jefferson's statute] as an alternative to Henry's general assessment bill and guided it to passage in the Virginia Assembly in January 1786."

Text of statute

See also

 First Freedom Center
 Jefferson Bible
 National Religious Freedom Day
 Separation of church and state in the United States
 United States Bill of Rights

References

External links

 

Separation of church and state in the United States
Freedom of religion in the United States
Virginia law
Christianity and law in the 18th century
Works by Thomas Jefferson
Legal history of Virginia
1786 in Virginia
1786 in law
American political philosophy literature
1786 works
1786 in religion